Antiplanes spirinae is a species of sea snail, a marine gastropod mollusk in the family Pseudomelatomidae.

Description

Distribution
This marine species occurs off the Kurile Islands, Russia and in the Sea of Japan.

References

 Kantor, Yu I., and A. V. Sysoev. "Mollusks of the genus Antiplanes (Gastropoda: Turridae) of the northwestern Pacific Ocean." The Nautilus 105.4 (1991): 119–146.

External links
 

spirinae
Gastropods described in 1991